The Utva is a river in Perm Krai, Russia, a right tributary of the Veslyana, which in turn is a tributary of the Kama. The source of the river is in the extreme southwest of the Gaynsky District of Perm Krai, near the border with Kirov Oblast and the Komi Republic. The main tributaries are the Chugrum (right) and the Yuzhnaya Anva (left).

References 

Rivers of Perm Krai